Action civique Montréal (ACM) was a municipal political party that existed from 2009 to 2010 in Montreal, Quebec, Canada. The party fielded five candidates in the 2009 Montreal municipal election, all of whom ran in the borough of Saint-Leonard. ACM's leader was Italo Barone, who was also its candidate for borough mayor.

Platform
ACM advocated the devolution of municipal services from the City of Montreal to Saint-Leonard. In announcing the party's formation, Barone said that he was open to the possibility of withdrawing Saint-Leonard from Montreal and returning the community to its pre-2001 status as a separate municipality.

Party leader
Italo Barone is a Montreal entrepreneur. He was elected to the Saint-Leonard city council in 1990 as a member of Frank Zampino's Parti municipal and was re-elected in 1994 and 1998. He later sought election to the new Saint-Leonard borough council in the 2001 municipal election, following Saint-Leonard's amalgamation into Montreal. Running for Pierre Bourque's Vision Montreal party, he finished second against Mario Battista from Gérald Tremblay's Montreal Island Citizens' Union. The 2009 election was his first as a party leader.

Results and aftermath
ACM received 5,723 votes, and none of its candidates were elected. Barone received about 10% of the vote in the mayoral contest, finishing third against incumbent Michel Bissonnet of the Union Montreal party. ACM was disestablished in September 2010.

Electoral record

References

Municipal political parties in Montreal